John Egbunu (born October 31, 1994) is a Nigerian-born American basketball player for Gaziantep Basketbol of the Basketbol Süper Ligi (BSL). Standing 6'10" (2.08 m), Egbunu plays the center position. In his first professional season, he played for the Long Island Nets in the NBA G League. He played center collegiately for the University of South Florida and the University of Florida.

Early life and high school career
Egbunu was born in 1994 in Nigeria. He later moved to the United States, settling in Georgia. He attended high school at Georgia Elite in Atlanta, where he played his freshman and sophomore seasons of basketball. Egbunu later moved to Fort Walton Beach for his junior and senior seasons. As a high school athlete, Egbunu was recorded as having a 40-in vertical jump. He was also ranked 72nd by ESPN on its list of top high school recruits. He ranked 7th nationally as an overall high school recruit. At 6'10", Egbunu was recognized for his strong rim defense and ability to run the floor.

College career
Egbunu played his freshman season in 2013–14 at the University of South Florida (USF). He started 31 of 32 games and enjoyed a successful freshman season. He set the record of most rebounds for a freshman with a total of 198. He scored season highs of 11 points and 11 rebounds against Santa Clara and 20 points and 20 rebounds against Memphis. Egbunu averaged 7.4 points and 6.2 rebounds as a freshman, earning American Athletic Conference All-Rookie Team honors. Following the season, he transferred to Florida, sitting out the 2014–15 season per NCAA regulations.

Appearing on the court for his first season of play, Egbunu's 2015–16 sophomore season featured tremendous success. He recorded his first double-double as a Gator (third total) with 17 points and 11 rebounds against Florida Gulf Coast. In the Gators' game against Richmond, both Egbunu and teammate Devin Robinson set record double-doubles (Egbunu with 17 points, 14 rebounds and Robinson with 12 points, 13 rebounds) in the same game, accomplishing a feat not seen since former Gators Vernon Macklin and Alex Tyus did so in a 2010 game against Jacksonville. During his sophomore season, Egbunu suffered a torn ligament in his right thumb prior to the SEC Tournament and appeared in only three games following the injury before undergoing season-ending surgery. He would miss the Gators' final two games. During his sophomore season, Egbunu led the Gators in most blocked shots (48), with a field goal percentage of .591 and ranked 2nd in rebounds with 6.5 on average.

During Egbunu's 2016–17 junior season, he started 19 of 24 total games played and averaged 7.8 points and 6.6 rebounds per game. His season was cut short by a torn ACL suffered on February 14, 2017. He would not return for his 2017–18 senior season as he continued to rehabilitate his ACL injury. While at UF, Egbunu played a total of 58 games and started 49 of those games. He posted a career total of 578 points and 378 rebounds.

Professional career
Egbunu entered the NBA Draft as early as 2017 before withdrawing. He entered the following year and was not selected. 

On September 25, 2019, Egbunu signed a contract with the Brooklyn Nets and briefly attended their training camp. On October 14, Egbunu's contract was waived.

Egbunu joined the Long Island Nets and started 5 of 26 games played during the 2019–2020 season. He missed several games with a sprained ankle. On December 27, 2019, Egbunu scored a career-high 26 points and grabbed 10 rebounds in a 107-91 loss to the Canton Charge. He averaged 10.3 points 7.4 rebounds, and 1.3 blocks per game.

On September 22, 2020, Egbunu entered the South Korean Basketball League after joining the Busan KT Sonicboom for the 2020–21 season. His most recent record includes starting 2 of 4 games averaging 40 points with 19 points made from field goal range.

On January 29, 2021, he signed for Pallacanestro Varese of the Italian Lega Basket Serie A (LBA) until the end of the 2020–21 season. Egbunu averaged 8.4 points, 7.6 rebounds, and 1.5 blocks per game. He re-signed with the team on July 22. Egbunu averaged 11.0 points and 9.4 rebounds per game. His contract was terminated on December 24. 

The following day, Egbunu signed with Hapoel Jerusalem of the Israeli Premier League.

On June 29, 2022, he has signed with Gaziantep Basketbol of the Basketbol Süper Ligi (BSL).

References

External links
Florida Gators bio
John Egbunu at RealGM

1994 births
Living people
Centers (basketball)
Florida Gators men's basketball players
Gaziantep Basketbol players
Hapoel Jerusalem B.C. players
Long Island Nets players
Nigerian expatriate basketball people in Italy
Nigerian expatriate basketball people in the United States
Nigerian men's basketball players
People from Bauchi State
South Florida Bulls men's basketball players
Suwon KT Sonicboom players